Normandy may refer to:

 Normandy, the geographical and cultural region in North-west Europe
 Normandy (administrative region), the administrative region of France

Normandy may also refer to:
Upper Normandy, a former region of France
Lower Normandy, a former region of France

Historical connections
Duchy of Normandy (ca. 912–1465), on which the French province was predicated
The Channel Islands are a former part of the Duchy of Normandy and are known as Les Iles Anglo-Normandes in French.
Operation Overlord, the 1944 Normandy Campaign of World War II
The Normandy landings of 6 June 1944
The Normandy American Cemetery and Memorial, established as a result of the 1944 invasion

United Kingdom
Normandy, Isles of Scilly
Normandy, Surrey, England

United States
Normandy, Illinois
Normandy, Missouri
Normandy, Philadelphia, Pennsylvania
Normandy, Tennessee
Normandy, Texas

Vessels
MS Normandy, a ferry built in 1981
PS Normandy, a British paddle-wheel steamer which sank in 1870
USS Normandy, a Ticonderoga-class cruiser of the United States Navy

Other uses
Normandy Mining, a defunct Australian mining company
 "Normandy" (Sanctuary), a season three episode of the television series Sanctuary
Normandy (Mass Effect), a starship in the original Mass Effect video game trilogy
The Normandy, an apartment building in New York City

See also
Normandie (disambiguation)